The BPF Youth (Belarusian: Моладзь БНФ, translit.  Moladź BNF) is the largest youth-led, party political organization in Belarus, the youth wing of the BPF Party.

References

External links
 Official website

Belarusian nationalism
Politics of Belarus
Youth politics
Youth organizations based in Belarus
Organizations established in 2005